Marshall Islands Athletics, also known as Marshall Islands Athletics Federation (MIAF) is the governing body for the sport of athletics in Marshall Islands.

History 
Athletes from the Marshall Islands participated already at the 1969 Micronesian Games, (the Marshall Islands then still being part of the Trust Territory of the Pacific Islands,) and also after re-establishment of the Games in 1990.

The foundation of MIAF is reported for 1987, as well as its affiliation to the IAAF in the same year.

Melvin Majmeto served as president of MIAF.

Current president is former shot putter and discus thrower Rais Aho.

Affiliations 
International Association of Athletics Federations (IAAF)
Oceania Athletics Association (OAA)
Moreover, it is part of the following national organisations:
Marshall Islands National Olympic Committee (MINOC)

National records 
MIAF maintains the Marshallese records in athletics.

References

External links
Official Webpage

Marshall Islands
Sports in the Marshall Islands
Athletics in the Marshall Islands
Athletics
National governing bodies for athletics
Sports organizations established in 1987
1987 establishments in Oceania